William Ive was Mayor of Sandwich Kent, England in 1348–9. He was the father of the Member of Parliament for Sandwich, William Ive, junior.

References

Year of birth missing
Year of death missing
People from Sandwich, Kent
14th-century English people
Mayors of places in Kent